The Pacifying Police Unit (also translated as Police Pacification Unit), abbreviated UPP, is a law enforcement and social services program pioneered in the state of Rio de Janeiro, Brazil, which aims to reclaim territories, most commonly favelas, controlled by gangs of drug dealers. The program was created and implemented by State Public Security Secretary , with the backing of Rio Governor Sérgio Cabral.  The stated goal of Rio's government is to install 40 UPPs by 2014. By May 2013, 231 favelas had come under the UPP umbrella. The UPP program scored initial success expelling gangs, and won broad praise. But the expensive initiative expanded too far, too fast into dozens of favelas as state finances cratered, causing a devastating backslide that enabled gangs to recover some of their lost grip.

UPP sought to implement "community-oriented policing" (in contrast to militarized policing). According to one study, the effectiveness of UPP depended a lot on how preexisting criminal gangs were organized in any given territory. In territories where criminal gangs effectively reduced violence and maintained order, UPP's presence was seen as undesirable by the community. However, in territory where gangs did not restrain crime and violence, UPP officers were perceived by the community as legitimate.

Background
For decades, many of Rio de Janeiro's favelas have been controlled by gangs of armed drug traffickers. Beginning with the first UPP that was implemented in Santa Marta in 2008, many of Rio's major favelas have received pacifying police forces. For decades, Rio has seen a cycle of police raiding favelas, having shootouts with traffickers, and then withdrawing again.  And also part of the cycle were frequent wars between different traffickers, leading to more shootouts, endangering the lives of the people living in many of these favelas.

The favelas chosen for the UPP program have previously not paid for public utilities but would have to pay fees to whatever criminal organization controlled the area; this often leads to a recurrence of extortion and tax evasion.

Therefore, the concept for the UPP (which was given even more impetus once Rio was chosen to host the FIFA World Cup and the Summer Olympic Games) was finally put into action as a first-step solution to deal with the urban cycle of violence.

Implementation
Before a UPP is established in a favela area, gang leaders are driven out by Rio's elite police battalion, BOPE, who search for heavy weaponry and drug caches (during this stage, and thereafter, there is an effort to encourage residents to report criminal activity to an anonymous phone number managed by Rio's government called Disque Denúncia).
The inauguration of a new UPP is timed with the exit of BOPE from the area and the replacement of hundreds of newly trained policemen, who work within the particular area of favelas as a permanent police force.

As of September 2013, 34 UPPs have been established within Rio de Janeiro with the stated goal of Rio's government to install 40 UPPs by 2014. Some UPPs, such as for that for Rocinha, only cover the territory of one specific favela, while other UPPs such as Manguinhos or Jacarezinho, also each cover smaller favela communities under their administrative umbrella.

Other favelas that now have UPPs include Cidade de Deus, Dona Marta, and Morro da Babilônia. In general, where the UPPs have been implemented, violent crime has fallen dramatically, while property values have increased.

Results
Because the favelas with UPPs had formerly been controlled by armed drug traffickers for more than twenty-five years, the fear of retribution, which was a mainstay of the "law of the traffickers", is slow to die.  For instance, in April 2012 when a drug trafficker who had formerly controlled the favela of Mangueira was shot and killed during a police operation in Jacarezinho (before the area had received its own UPP), others from the same criminal faction ordered businesses to close their doors early in Mangueira — which they did.  This despite the fact that Mangueira has a permanent pacification police force as part of its own UPP.  A similar occurrence of businesses closing their doors early in Mangueira because the traffickers ordered it occurred in February 2013.

In May 2012, Beltrame acknowledged that armed criminals had migrated from parts of Rio that have a large police presence due to areas with less police and no UPPs, such as nearby Niterói, across the bay.  Beltrame has stated however that he believes based on analysis of crime data that only gang leaders higher in the hierarchy could reestablish in other favela communities (without UPPs); and that lower level traffickers have a much harder time integrating into other geographic areas.

While the favela areas under pacification have seen improvements, the concentration of criminals has increased in other parts of Rio de Janeiro that don't have the direct benefits of permanent pacification police forces actively patrolling the neighborhoods.  Among these are the Baixada Fluminense, Niterói, and certain neighborhoods in the North Zone.

It was obvious early on that criminals fled particular favelas before BOPE entered.  Previously, when police had attempted to encircle a favela to arrest and kill traffickers in surprise attacks, large-scale shootouts would ensue, and innocent residents were caught in the crossfire.

While more high-profile gang leaders (also referred to in Rio's media as "traffickers") have been forced to leave favelas now administered by UPP police forces, their familial connections remain. Also, gang members from other favelas who are of the same faction as residents under UPPs, still coordinate and visit each other. Exemplifying this point, one of Rio's newspapers reported on 9 July 2012 that groups of criminals fired upon police in different locations within the Complexo do Alemão on the same day that military forces completed their final withdrawal from the area.

There is a well known history of police abuse and corruption in Rio de Janeiro, and for years this only added fuel to the war between drug traffickers controlling Rio's favelas and the police.

In recent years there have been concerted efforts under Secretary Beltrame to root out corrupt police; and this is the very reason that the community policing of the favelas under the UPP program are staffed by new recruits coming straight from the UPP police academy — such as the 750 officers who will be policing the large Rocinha favela beginning in August 2012.

Beltrame has stated that the main purpose of the UPPs is more toward stopping armed men from ruling the streets than to put an end to drug trafficking. A 2010 report by the World Organization Against Torture (OMCT) did note the drop in the homicide rate within Rio de Janeiro's favelas.

Other indicators

A survey that was conducted among Rio's favela residents in July 2012 (where UPP's have been implemented) showed that there has been a reduction in the number of violent crimes and deaths.  Other crimes that previously went unreported in favelas are now showing up in the crime statistics such as theft, domestic violence, and rape.  Other results of the survey showed that people felt more free to discuss previously taboo topics such as street violence and illegal drug activity, but many are still intimidated to speak out, fearing that the UPP measure is only temporary.

Unemployment is reportedly quite low in some South Zone favelas such as Pavão-Pavãozinho, (in Copacabana) where the unemployment rate was reported as 5% in July 2012, compared with neighborhoods in the North Zone where life is often more difficult, where the median income is 34.4% less than in pacified favelas in the South Zone. In the South Zone favela of Chapéu Mangueira, (near Rio's famous beaches) 92.2% of residents own a cell phone.

Journalists within Rio studying ballot results from the 2012 municipal elections observed that those living within favelas administered by UPPs distributed their votes among a wider spectrum of candidates compared to areas controlled by drug lords or other organized crime groups or gangs such as milícias.

Violence
On 23 July 2012, the first police officer to die in a UPP administered favela was shot and killed by criminals within the Nova Brasília area of the Complexo do Alemão.  At the time of the shooting, the female officer, 30-year-old Fabiana Aparecida de Souza, who had only been on the force a few months, was at a small UPP station within the favela, when the building was shot at by 12 assailants and she was hit in the abdomen by a rifle bullet.  Ten minutes before this occurred, eight assailants shot at two officers patrolling the Pedra do Sapo part of the Complexo, but nobody was injured.

The previous week, police were patrolling the area of Fazendinha within the Complexo when they were attacked two different times.  In one of the incidents, a grenade was thrown which exploded near their patrol car. (As a result of the attack resulting in the death of the police officer, an additional 500 UPP police officers were assigned to the Complexo, raising the total number to 1,800 officers working within that particular community).

UPPs in Rio de Janeiro

See also
 Brazilian police militias
 Case of Amarildo de Souza
 C3 policing
 Philippine Drug War

References

External links
Official website 

Law enforcement in Brazil
Favelas
Rio de Janeiro (state)
Brazilian police officers
Crime prevention
Organized crime in Brazil
2008 establishments in Brazil